"Say Yes" is the final track of Elliott Smith's 1997 album Either/Or, and one of three tracks from Either/Or that was used in the soundtrack of Good Will Hunting.

Background and content 

"Say Yes" is one of Smith's widely recognized songs. It is considered happy and optimistic in both instrumentation and lyrics in comparison to the dark tone in most of his other songs. In an interview, Smith said that the song was written about "someone particular, and I almost never do that. I was really in love with someone."

Live performances 

Smith performed the song often, even during full band shows, in which he would play the song solo on an acoustic guitar.

Reception
Pitchfork said, "It's a straight-ahead love song, one that dares to hope. Listen closely and you'll hear just how fragile that hope is: Smith whispers most of the song. He wavers. His fingers pluck out a simple question on the acoustic."

Legacy 
"Say Yes" has been used in a wide variety of movies, including Hurricane Streets and American Pie Presents: The Book of Love, as well as being covered by Death Cab for Cutie and live by Ben Folds. It was also covered in an episode of One Tree Hill, when Bryan Greenberg sings to his daughter Jenny.

Cover versions

References 

Elliott Smith songs
1997 songs
1997 singles
Song recordings produced by Tom Rothrock
Songs written by Elliott Smith